Insight is a 2021 American action film produced and directed by Livi Zheng and starring Ken Zheng, who also wrote the screenplay.

Premise
Jian is a counter-terrorism agent with skills in martial arts and clairvoyance.  With reluctant help from detectives of the Los Angeles Police Department, Jian investigates the death of his brother (alleged to have been a suicide) while fighting against a high-tech criminal.

Cast
Ken Zheng as Jian
Madeline Zima as Abby
Sean Patrick Flanery as Wallace Jackson
John Savage as Frank
Adam Huss as Mason
Tony Todd as Carl
Keith David as Captain Duke

Release
In February 2021, Gravitas Ventures acquired North American distribution rights to the film, which was released on March 12, 2021.

Reception
Tara McNamara of Common Sense Media awarded the film one star out of five.

Christian Gallichio of Film Threat rated the film a 1 out of 10 and wrote, "There’s truly little redeeming about Insight, as the film leaves only a faint lingering impression — mainly indifference."

References

External links
 
 

2021 films
2021 action films
American action films
2020s English-language films
2020s American films